The Aragvi and its basin are in Georgia on the southern slopes of the Caucasus Mountains. The ground strata are mostly sandstone, slate, and limestone. The Zhinvali Dam and its 130 MW hydro-electric power station generate much of Georgia's power, and its construction in 1986 formed the Zhinvali Reservoir, upon whose north-western shores rises Ananuri castle with its 17th-century Church of the Assumption.

Confusion over name and course
Given its etymology (see below; the word simply means "river"), the exact course of the Aragvi River is the source of some confusion. The river has several important tributaries, all called "aragvi":

The Tetri Aragvi ("White Aragvi") flows from Gudauri down to the town of Pasanauri, where it is joined by the Shavi Aragvi ("Black Aragvi"), the main river of Gudamakari to the north-east. Together, these two rivers continue as, simply, "the Aragvi"; from Pasanauri, the Aragvi flows south-east to the Jinvali Reservoir, where it is joined by the Pshav Aragvi (itself fed by the Khevsur Aragvi) before flowing south to merge with the Mtkvari by Mtskheta, Eastern Georgia's ancient capital just north of Tbilisi.

Etymology
See არაგვი for the origin of the name.

Use and infrastructure
Besides generating up to 130 MW of electricity, the waters of the Aragvi feed down a  pipe to provide drinking water in Tbilisi and to irrigate fields.

Gallery

Notes

Rivers of Georgia (country)